This article contains information about the literary events and publications of 1846.

Events

January 3 – The American author Edgar Allan Poe issues the final edition of the Broadway Journal, a journal he owned for just a few months. 
January 15 – Fyodor Dostoevsky's first original novel, Poor Folk (Бедные люди, Bednye Lyudi), is published in the St. Petersburg Collection.
January 21 – The Daily News, edited by Charles Dickens, first appears in London. After 17 issues Dickens hands over as editor to his friend John Forster. It continues until 1930.
April
Hans Christian Andersen's Fairy Tales are first translated into English, beginning with "The Little Mermaid" in Bentley's Miscellany.
Poe's essay "The Philosophy of Composition" is published in Graham's Magazine.
c. May 22 – The Brontë sisters' first published work, the collection Poems by Currer, Ellis, and Acton Bell, appears in London. It sells only two copies in the first year.
June 27 – Charlotte Brontë completes the manuscript of her novel The Professor. It is offered to several publishers during the year but rejected.
August 15 – The Scott Monument to Sir Walter Scott in Edinburgh (Scotland) is inaugurated.
September 12 – The poets Elizabeth Barrett and Robert Browning marry privately in St Marylebone Parish Church, London, and depart for the continent a week later.
October 1 – Serial publication of Charles Dickens's Dombey and Son begins.
November 21 – The String of Pearls: a Romance, probably written by James Malcolm Rymer and Thomas Peckett Prest, begins serialization in Britain. This is the first literary appearance of Sweeney Todd.
unknown dates
Mary Howitt's Wonderful Stories for Children is the first English translation of works by Hans Christian Andersen to be published in book format.
Isaac D. Baker and Charles Scribner form the New York City publisher Baker & Scribner, predecessor of Charles Scribner's Sons.

New books

Fiction
Honoré de Balzac – Cousin Bette (La Cousine Bette)
Edward Bulwer-Lytton – The Children of the Night
James Fenimore Cooper – The Redskins
Charles Dickens
The Battle of Life (novella)
Dombey and Son (serialization begins)
Fyodor Dostoevsky
 The Double: A Petersburg Poem (Двойник, Dvoynik; novella)
 Poor Folk (Бедные люди, Bednye Lyudi)
Alexandre Dumas, père
Le Chevalier de Maison-Rouge (The Knight of the Maison-Rouge: A Novel of Marie Antoinette)
The Count of Monte Cristo (Le Comte de Monte-Cristo, serialization concluded; first English translation)
La Dame de Montsoreau
Mémoires d'un médecin: Joseph Balsamo ("Memoirs of a Physician: vol. 1, Joseph Balsamo")
Dmitry Grigorovich – The Village (Деревня, Derevnya)
Nathaniel Hawthorne – Mosses from an Old Manse
Mór Jókai – Weekdays (Hétköznapok)
James Sheridan Knowles – Fortescue
Frederick Marryat – The Privateersman
Herman Melville – Typee
George Sand –  (The Devil's Pond)
Thomas Dunn English - 1844; or, The Power of the "SF"

Children
Anne Knight – School-Room Lyrics
Hannah and Mary Townsend – The Anti-Slavery Alphabet

Drama
Paul Bocage – Échec et mat
Carolina Coronado – El cuadro de la esperanza
Gustav Freytag – Die Valentine
Eugène Marin Labiche and Auguste Lefranc – Frisette
 George William Lovell 
 Look Before You Leap
 The Wife's Secret
Martins Pena – first performances
A Barriga do Meu Tio
Os Ciúmes de um Pedestre, ou O Terrível Capitão do Mato

Os Meirinhos
Um Segredo de Estado
O Usurário
Joseph Isidore Samson – La Famille poisson

Poetry
Gottfried Keller – Gedichte (Poems)
Edward Lear – Book of Nonsense
Henry Wadsworth Longfellow – The Belfry of Bruges

Non-fiction
Selim Aga – Incidents Connected with the Life of Selim Aga, A Native of Central Africa
Mary Anne Atwood (as Θυος Μαθος) – Early Magnetism in its Higher Relations to Humanity
Curtis H. Cavender (as H.C. Decanver) – Catalogue of Works in Refutation of Methodism
Charles Dickens – Pictures from Italy
F. W. Fairholt – Costume in England
George Grote – A History of Greece (publication begins)
George W. Johnson – A Dictionary of Gardening
Søren Kierkegaard – Concluding Unscientific Postscript to Philosophical Fragments (Afsluttende uvidenskabelig Efterskrift til de philosophiske Smuler)
David Strauss – The Life of Jesus, Critically Examined, translated by George Eliot from Das Leben Jesu, kritisch bearbeitet
Theodor Waitz – Grundlegung der Psychologie (Foundation of Psychology)
William Whewell – Elements of Morality

Births
March 17 – Kate Greenaway, English book illustrator and writer (died 1901)
March 20 – Rebecca Richardson Joslin, American non-fiction writer (died 1934)
March 25 – Helen Zimmern, German-born English writer and translator (died 1934)
April 4 – Comte de Lautreamont (pen name of Isidore Lucien Ducasse), Uruguayan-born French poet and writer (died 1870)
April 24 – Marcus Clarke, Australian novelist and poet (died 1881)
May 5 – Henryk Sienkiewicz, Polish novelist (died 1916)
May 25 – Naim Frashëri, Albanian poet (died 1900)
June 3 – Estelle Mendell Amory, American educator and author (died 1923)
June 30 – Frances Margaret Milne, Irish-born American author and librarian (died 1910)
July 5 – Christian Reid (pen name of Frances Christine Fisher Tiernan), American author (died 1920)
August 2 – Lucy Clifford (née Lucy Lane), English novelist, dramatist and screenwriter (died 1929)
August 5
Louise Manning Hodgkins, American educator, author, and editor (died 1935)
Alvilde Prydz, Norwegian novelist (died 1922)
September 3 – Emma Shaw Colcleugh, American author  (died 1940)
October 1 – John Cadvan Davies, Welsh poet and Wesleyan Methodist minister (died 1923)
October 21 – Edmondo De Amicis, Italian novelist, journalist, poet and short-story writer (died 1908)
unknown date – Mary Foot Seymour, American businesswoman and writer (died 1893)

Deaths
January 6 – Lewis Goldsmith, Anglo-French journalist (born c. 1763)
February 9 – Henry Gally Knight, English writer and traveler (born 1786)
March 10 – Harriette Wilson, English memoirist (born 1786)
June 24 – Jan Frans Willems, Flemish poet and political activist (born 1793)
July 12 – Charlotte Elizabeth Tonna, English novelist (born 1790)
September 4 – Victor-Joseph Étienne de Jouy, French dramatist (born 1764)
November 23 – George Darley, Irish poet, novelist, and critic (born 1795)
December 13 – Pasquale Galluppi, Italian philosopher (born 1770)

Awards
Chancellor's Gold Medal – Edward Henry Bickersteth
Newdigate Prize – G. O. Morgan

References

 
Years of the 19th century in literature